The Felixton College is a small school based 15 minutes outside of Empangeni, KwaZulu-Natal, South Africa, in the village of Felixton. It caters from junior school to high school (grades RRRR –R, and 1–12).  The Felixton College is a member of the Independent Examinations Board (IEB), a South African independent assessment agency which offers examinations for various client schools.  The school offers numerous sports and after school activities.  Alongside extensive playing fields, the school have a swimming pool, tennis and squash courts and astro turf, and a golf course provided by the Felixton Country Club.

External links

Private schools in KwaZulu-Natal